Karakoçlu can refer to:

 Karakoçlu, Devrek
 Karakoçlu, Kemaliye